Faustino García-Moncó y Fernández (13 October 1916 – 6 June 1996) was a Spanish politician who served as Minister of Trade of Spain between 1965 and 1969, during the Francoist dictatorship.

References

1916 births
1996 deaths
Economy and finance ministers of Spain
Government ministers during the Francoist dictatorship